The Slovenian Women's Cup is the national women's football cup competition in Slovenia. It has been contested since the 1994–95 season.

Finals

See also
Slovenian Football Cup, men's edition

References

External links
Official website 
Cup at women.soccerway.com

Slo
Women's football competitions in Slovenia
1994 establishments in Slovenia
Women